Leke Samson James (born 1 November 1992) is a Nigerian professional footballer who plays as a forward for Sivasspor in Süper Lig.

Club career

Early career
He started out his career in his native homeland playing for Bridge Boys.

Aalesund
He transferred to Aalesund on 6 January 2012.

An injury obtained during pre-season hindered his path into the first team and he did not get back into full training until the start of July. On 26 July 2012 he made his first appearance for Aalesund coming on as a substitute at the start of the second half of the game versus Tirana in Europe League scoring twice in Aalesund's 5–0 win. On 29 July 2012 he made his debut in Tippeligaen and also started his first match, against Stabæk.

Beijing Enterprises Group
Between 2016 and 2017 he played for Chinese club Beijing Enterprises Group in China League One.

Molde
On 30 April 2018, Molde FK announced the signing of James on a three-year contract. He got his Molde debut on 26 July 2018 when he came on as a 67th minute substitute in Molde's 3–0 win against Laçi in the 2018–19 UEFA Europa League second qualifying round. James scored Molde's third goal in the game. On 22 June 2019, James scored a perfect hat-trick in the first half in Molde's 4–0 away win against Strømsgodset. He scored with his right foot, left foot and his head and completed his hat-trick in 13 minutes and 45 seconds. On 11 July 2019, James scored his second hat-trick for the club, his first in UEFA competitions, in Molde's 7–1 win over KR in the UEFA Europa League first qualifying round. James scored a brace in Molde's 4–0 win against Strømsgodset on Aker Stadion. He scored the third and fourth goal of the game that secured Molde their fourth league title, his first. James finished the 2019 season scoring 24 goals in 38 matches in all competitions.

Career statistics

Club

Honours
Molde
Eliteserien: 2019

Sivasspor
 Turkish Cup: 2021–22

References

External links
 

1992 births
Living people
Sportspeople from Kaduna
Nigerian footballers
Yoruba sportspeople
Aalesunds FK players
Beijing Sport University F.C. players
Molde FK players
Al-Qadsiah FC players
Sivasspor footballers
Eliteserien players
China League One players
Saudi Professional League players
Süper Lig players
Nigerian expatriate footballers
Expatriate footballers in Norway
Nigerian expatriate sportspeople in Norway
Expatriate footballers in China
Nigerian expatriate sportspeople in China
Expatriate footballers in Saudi Arabia
Nigerian expatriate sportspeople in Saudi Arabia
Expatriate footballers in Turkey
Nigerian expatriate sportspeople in Turkey
Association football forwards